Robert Åhman Persson (born 26 March 1987) is a Swedish former professional footballer who played as a defensive midfielder.

Career
Born in Uppsala, Robert Åhman Persson, a centre back, left back and central midfielder, was with Bälinge from childhood in 1991 until the age of 16 in 2003. He spent three years (2004–07) with AIK (including a 2006 loan to Väsby United), then moved to Viborg for a year and, subsequently, to Malmö FF from 2008 to 2010. He was a part of the team that won the championship, although he only belonged to the team for the half season. In the summer of 2010 he returned to AIK.

In the autumn 2013 it was official that AIK would not offer him a new contract. Later he was attached by newly promoted Örebro SK on a free transfer.

He moved to Belenenses in January 2017, but returned to his native country in June 2018 after playing 24 games in the Primeira Liga, signing a long term-deal with IK Sirius from his birth city Uppsala.

He announced his retirement from professional football on 20 May 2020, following a knee injury.

Career statistics

Honours

Malmö FF
 Allsvenskan: 2010

References

External links
  
  (archive)
 
 
 

1987 births
Living people
Footballers from Uppsala
Association football midfielders
Swedish footballers
Sweden youth international footballers
Sweden under-21 international footballers
AFC Eskilstuna players
AIK Fotboll players
Malmö FF players
Viborg FF players
Örebro SK players
C.F. Os Belenenses players
IK Sirius Fotboll players
Allsvenskan players
Superettan players
Danish Superliga players
Primeira Liga players
Swedish expatriate footballers
Expatriate men's footballers in Denmark
Swedish expatriate sportspeople in Denmark
Expatriate footballers in Portugal
Swedish expatriate sportspeople in Portugal